The 2022–23 New York Islanders season is the 51st season in the franchise's history. It is their second season in UBS Arena.

Standings

Divisional standings

Conference standings

Schedule and results

Preseason
The preseason schedule was published on June 28, 2022.

Regular season
The regular season schedule was published on July 6, 2022.

Player statistics
As of March 19, 2023

Skaters

Goaltenders

Roster

Transactions
The Islanders have been involved in the following transactions during the 2022–23 season.

Trades

Free agents

Waivers

Contract terminations

Retirement

Signings

Draft picks

Below are the New York Islanders' selections at the 2022 NHL Entry Draft, which was held on July 7 and 8, 2022, at Bell Centre in Montreal.

Notes:
 The Colorado Avalanche's second-round pick went to the New York Islanders as the result of a trade on October 12, 2020, that sent Devon Toews to Colorado in exchange for a second-round pick in 2021 and this pick.
 The Montreal Canadiens' fourth-round pick went to the New York Islanders as the result of a trade on July 7, 2022, that sent first-round pick in 2022 to Montreal in exchange for Alexander Romanov and this pick.

References

New York Islanders seasons
New York Islanders
New York Islanders
New York Islanders
New York Islanders